The Garda Panteri (Serbian: Гарда Пантери), also known as Specijalna Brigada Garda Panteri (Serbian: Специјална бригада Гарда Пантери), was an elite unit in the Army of Republika Srpska during the Bosnian War. It was founded on 2 May 1992 under the initial name of the Serbian National Guard of the Serbian Autonomous Oblast (SAO) of Semberija and Majevica (Serbian: Српска национална гарда (САО) Семберија и Мајевица; Srpska Nacionalna Garda (SAO) Semberija i Majevica), adopting the name "Garda Panteri" in honour of previous fallen commander Branko "Panter" Pantelić, by Ljubiša "Mauzer" Savić and members of the Serbian Solidarity Fund. It fought in Bosnia and Herzegovina (1992–1996) during the Yugoslav Wars.

Creation and organisation 

The Serbian Solidarity Fund, managed by Ljubiša Savić, began preparing for the defense of Serb territory in Majevica amid inter-ethnic tensions between Serbs and Bosniaks in 1991 and 1992. Around 1,000 members readily available for military action were stationed and monitored the situation in preparation to defend the Serb population in Bijeljina and Semberija, should they face armed aggression. During the night of March the 31st, 1992, barricades were laid by pro-SDA forces in an attempt to take over command and authoritative control of Bijeljina.

Serb forces quickly rallied themselves and with the aid of Željko "Arkan" Ražnatović removed the barriers. The pro-SDA forces then called for talks with SDS officials and leadership of Bijeljina. After these events, the 1,000 members of the Serbian Solidarity Fund and Ljubiša Savić created the unit with the name Serbian National Guard of the SAO of Semberija and Majevica, outside of the Motel Obrijež near Bijeljina.

Despite being officially known as a Light Infantry Brigade due to terminology derived from the Yugoslav National Army (JNA), a notable aspect of the guard was its extensive use of various improvised armoured vehicles (Referred to as the 'Iron Battalion'''). The creation of the vehicles was overseen by guard member Captain Mišel Ostojić. The unit also had a small aviation detachment, utilising the Antonov AN-2(s) and UTVA-75 for observation purposes. 

 Wartime 

The unit participated in many operations, namely the 'Corridor of Life' (Operation Corridor) and the capture of Tinja and Smoluća. Other engagements included Zvornik, Brčko, Majevica, Posavina, Bratunac, Ozren, Sarajevo, Kupres and Bihać. The unit was famous, receiving volunteers from neighbouring Bosnia and Herzegovina and Montenegro. In total, the unit suffered 106 dead and around 750 wounded fighters, with the loss of commander Branko Pantelić, who was killed in an ambush while fighting in Majevica on 4 September 1992. 

In 1993, turbo-folk singer Rodoljub Vulović released an album titled Panteri'', commemorating the achievements of the unit, including tracks such as  "Panteri", "Mauzer" and "Panteru za sjećanje".

See also 

 Bosnian War
 Army of Republika Srpska
 Ljubiša Savić

References 

Military of Republika Srpska
Military units and formations of Bosnia and Herzegovina
Military units and formations of the Bosnian War
1992 establishments in Serbia
1996 disestablishments in Serbia
Paramilitary organizations in the Yugoslav Wars